Oswald Astley Cheesman  (13 September 1913 – 29 September 1985) was a New Zealand musician, music teacher, conductor and composer. He was born in Christchurch, New Zealand, on 13 September 1913. After World War II, he was involved in forming first New Zealand Broadcasting Service's Auckland Radio Orchestra and then in 1946 and 1947 the National Orchestra, now the New Zealand Symphony Orchestra.

In 1970, he received the Benny Award from the Variety Artists Club of New Zealand Inc, the highest honour available to a New Zealand variety entertainer. In the 1972 Queen's Birthday Honours, he was appointed a Member of the Order of the British Empire, for services to music.

References

1913 births
1985 deaths
New Zealand conductors (music)
Male conductors (music)
People from Christchurch
New Zealand Symphony Orchestra people
20th-century conductors (music)
New Zealand Members of the Order of the British Empire
20th-century male musicians